WIG, originally an acronym for Warszawski Indeks Giełdowy (Warsaw Stock Exchange Index) is the oldest index of the Warsaw Stock Exchange, introduced on the WSE's first trading session on 16 April 1991. WIG lists 318 companies (as of 5 February 2010).

WIG subindices 
WIG20
WIG30
MWIG40 (before MIDWIG)
SWIG80 (before WIRR)
TECHWIG
WIG-BANKI
WIG-BUDOW
WIG-INFO
WIG-MEDIA
WIG-PALIWA
WIG-SPOŻY
WIG-TELKO
WIG-PL

External links 
 WIG on the Warsaw Stock Exchange
Bloomberg page for WIG:IND

European stock market indices
Warsaw Stock Exchange
1991 establishments in Poland